Queen City High School is a public high school located in the city of Queen City, Texas (USA). It is classified as a 3A school by the UIL. It is part of the Queen City Independent School District located in northeast Cass County bordering Atlanta, Texas to the south. In 2015, the school was rated "Met Standard" by the Texas Education Agency.

It serves Queen City, Domino, and a portion of Atlanta.

Athletics
The Athletics Director of Queen City High School is Eric Droddy, and he was hired in April 2019. He is also the head football coach. The head coach for the school's baseball program is William Powell. The head coach for the boys' basketball team is DeAundre Hill, and the girl's position is currently vacant.

Queen City High School competes in the following sports:

Baseball
Basketball
Cross Country
Football
Golf
Powerlifting
Softball
Tennis
Track and Field
Volleyball

Retired Numbers
Ty Ball, 75 (posthumously awarded)

State Titles
Baseball - 
1992(3A)

Notable alumni
Jason Peters, NFL Offensive Lineman for the Buffalo Bills, Philadelphia Eagles, and Chicago Bears. Class of 2000

Band
UIL Marching Band State Champions
2007(2A), 2009(2A), 2011(2A)
UIL Marching Band State Medalists
2005(2A), 2013(2A), 2019(3A), 2021(3A)
From around 2001 to 2011, the band was under the direction of Chris Brannan. From 2012 forward, under the direction of Billy Vess. The band has 9 consecutive state and state finals appearances, starting in 2005. The staff includes Billy Vess, Kim Madlock, Stephen Bynum, Justin Caldwell, and Makayla Anglin. The band was awarded as the 2020 UIL Honor Band runner-up.

Notable Alumni:
Zach Worley, Blue Devils alumni

References

External links
Queen City Independent School District

Schools in Cass County, Texas
Public high schools in Texas